Harry Peter Dwan (8 December 1918 – 5 August 2010) was an Australian rules footballer who played with Richmond and Hawthorn in the Victorian Football League (VFL).

Notes

External links 
		

1918 births
2010 deaths
Australian rules footballers from Victoria (Australia)
Richmond Football Club players
Hawthorn Football Club players